Elaine Monica Chuli (born May 16, 1994) is a Canadian ice hockey goaltender, currently playing with the Toronto Six of the Premier Hockey Federation (PHF), formerly the National Women's Hockey League (NWHL). She played college ice hockey with the UConn Huskies and is the all-time saves leader for both the Hockey East (WHEA) conference and the Huskies program.

Playing career

NCAA 
Elaine Chuli was a member of the UConn Huskies women's ice hockey team during 2012 to 2016. In her senior year, she was named to the 2016 CCM/AHCA All-American Second Team.

CWHL 
She was drafted by the Vanke Rays in the second round of the 2017 CWHL Draft and signed with the Rays for the 2017–18 season. In her first season, she played 1516 minutes in net, more than any other goalie in the league, though the team missed the playoffs.

After the Rays were merged with the Kunlun Red Star WIH to become the Shenzhen KRS Vanke Rays, Chuli signed with the Toronto Furies, where she would play for the 2018–19 season before the CWHL folded.

PWHPA 
In May 2019, Chuli joined over 200 players of the women's game in forming the PWHPA. She played for Team Knox at the Unifor Showcase in Toronto in September 2019, the first showcase of the PWHPA's Dream Gap Tour, and then for Team Spooner at the Secret Women’s Hockey Showcase in January 2020.

NWHL/PHF 
In April 2020, she signed with the NWHL’s first Canadian expansion team, the Toronto Six. Starting in the Six’s first game, a January 23, 2021 affair versus the Metropolitan Riveters, Chuli was recognized as the Second Star of the Game in a 3-0 loss. Against the eventual Isobel Cup champion Boston Pride, the Six enjoyed their first win. Opposing the Pride on January 26, 2021, Chuli recorded 24 svaes in the win., a 2-1 final with third period goals by Brooke Boquist and Mikyla Grant-Mentis, whose goal stood as the game-winner.

International play 

Chuli competed as member of Team Canada at the 2012 IIHF World Women's U18 Championship. She joined a roster filled with other future hockey stars, including Cayley Mercer, Laura Stacey, Erin Ambrose, goaltender Emerance Maschmeyer, and future Toronto Six teammate Taylor Woods. Chuli was in the crease for two of Team Canada’s five games, playing the full 60 minutes in each. Against Germany in the group stage she posted a 6–0 shutout and, five days later, she posted a 7–0 shutout against Sweden in the semifinals, cementing herself as the top goaltender of the tournament, with a 1.000 save percentage and 0 goals against average. Her performance helped Team Canada sweep the tournament and win the gold medal that year.

Personal life 
Chuli holds a degree in accounting from the University of Connecticut.

Career statistics

Regular season and playoffs 

Sources:

International

Awards and honors

Weekly/monthly collegiate honours and awards

 Hockey East (WHEA) Goaltender of the Month (2)
January 2014 (co-awarded with BC’s Corinne Boyles)
February 2015
 Hockey East (WHEA) Defensive Player of the Week (11)
 2013–14: September 30, January 6, January 27, February 10 (co-awarded with BU’s Sarah Lefort)
2014–15: September 29, December 1, January 5, January 12 (co-awarded with BC’s Emily Pfalzer), March 2, March 9 
2015–16: November 2, February 1, February 15, February 29

Professional 
 2020-21 NWHL regular season leader, Wins 
 Finalist, 2021 NWHL Goaltender of the Year
 Winner, PHF Goaltender of the Year

References

External links

Elaine Chuli on Twitter

Vanke Rays players
Toronto Furies players
1994 births
Living people
Ice hockey people from Ontario
Canadian women's ice hockey goaltenders
Professional Women's Hockey Players Association players
Toronto Six players
UConn Huskies women's ice hockey players